The CWA Historical Dagger (currently called the CWA Endeavor Historical Dagger) is an annual award given by the British Crime Writers' Association to the author of the best historical crime novel of the year. Established in 1999, it is presented to a novel "with a crime theme and a historical background of any period up to 35 years before the current year".

The award was called the Ellis Peters Historical Dagger from 1999 to 2005, and was known as the Ellis Peters Historical Award from 2006 to 2012, to commemorate the life and work of historical crime writer Ellis Peters, whose Cadfael Chronicles (1977–1994) are generally credited with popularizing the genre that would become known as the historical mystery.

Starting in 2014, the award became known as the CWA Endeavour Historical Dagger through sponsorship by Endeavor Press.

Honorees

References

External links

1999 establishments in the United Kingdom
Awards established in 1999
Crime Writers' Association awards
Mystery and detective fiction awards